Count Stefan Adam Zamoyski (17 February 1904 – 27 October 1976) was a Polish nobleman, landowner, and magnate.

Stefan had a degree of Doctor of Law. He was owner of estates in Wysock. Lt.-Col. Count Stefan Zamoyski served as an aide-de-camp to Polish Prime Minister-in-exile Wladislaw Sikorski in London. In December 1940, Lt.-Col. Zamoyski wrote to the head of RAF Bomber Command, requesting that the German concentration camp Auschwitz be bombed to allow the Polish political prisoners there at the time to escape; the RAF declined to act.  He was awarded with the Virtuti Militari Order.

Following World War II, Count Zamoyski remained in Britain. He was working at the Jockey Club when he came into contact with Captain Kazimierz Bobinski and working together, they finished Bobinski's work in compiling the Bobinski-Zamoyski Family Tables of Racehorses, published in 1954.

He married Elżbieta Czartoryska on 26 June 1929 in Gołuchów. They have three children:

 Maria Helena Zamoyska (born on 12 February 1940 in Rome)
 Zdzisław Klemens Zamoyski (born on 25 September 1943 in Washington, D.C.)
 Adam Stefan Zamoyski (born 11 January 1949)

Stefan Adam Zamoyski
1904 births
1976 deaths
Counts of Poland
Recipients of the Virtuti Militari